The El Bosque Formation is a geologic formation in Mexico. It preserves fossils of plants, vertebrates, invertebrates and calcareous algae dating back to the Eocene period.

See also 

 List of fossiliferous stratigraphic units in Mexico

References

External links 
 

Geologic formations of Mexico
Paleogene Mexico